Wiebesia pumilae is a hymenoptera insect of the family fig wasps (Agaonidae). It pollinates the awkeotsang creeping fig. It is found in China, Hong Kong, and Taiwan. The scientific name was first published as Blastophaga pumilae in 1967 by Hill.

References

Agaonidae